Breakthrough Entertainment is a Canadian production company founded in 1986 by Peter Williamson and Ira Levy. It produces famous Canadian TV shows such as Jimmy Two-Shoes and Atomic Betty.

On July 10, 2018, 9 Story Media Group acquired Breakthrough Entertainment's kids and family library and development slate.

Information
Based in Toronto, Ontario, Canada, Breakthrough Entertainment produces a variety of programming, including primetime comedy and drama series, factual entertainment, documentaries, television movies, feature films, family entertainment and children's animation. The company has licensed programs to major broadcasters in over 200 territories, handling worldwide pre-sales, co-productions, and third-party acquisitions.

Films and series
 The Adventures of Dudley the Dragon (1993-1997)
 The Adventures of Napkin Man! (2015-2017)
 Atomic Betty (2004-2007)
 Battlefields Mysteries (2013)
 Between The Sheets With Rebecca Rosenblat! (2017-present)
 Bite (2013)
 Blood and Water (2014-2016)
 Bruno & Boots (2016-present)
 Captain Flamingo (2006-2007)
 Children of Chelm (2011-2012)
 Class Act (2016)
 Crash Canyon (2011-2012)
 Design Match (2013)
 The Edge of Extinction (2013)
 Exchanging Vows (2013)
 Face to Face (2014)
 Faking a Murderer (2020)
 The Family Dance (2014)
 Femme Fatale (2015)
 For King and Country (Dec 20, 2015)
 For King and Empire (Dec 26, 2015)
 I Love Mummy (2014-present)
 In Korea With Norm Christie (2016)
 Inside the Parole Board (2015)
 It Seems Like Yesterday (2014)
 Jenny and the Queen of Light (2016)
 Jimmy Two-Shoes (2009-2012)
 Kenny vs. Spenny (2003-2010)
 KidsWorld Sports (2005)
 Less Than Kind (2011-2013)
 Life's Little Miracles (1999)
 L.M. Montgomery's Anne of Green Gables
 Lost Battlefields (2016)
 The Manic Organic (2017)
 Med Students (2015)
 Medical Maverick (2013)
 Miss BG (2005)
 Mr. Men (1995-1997)
 Max & Shred (2014-2016)
 My Big Big Friend (2009-2014)
 My Big Big Friend: The Movie (2022)
 Out in Black (2015)
 Paradise Falls (2015)
 Patient Files (2015-present)
 Please Kill Mr. Know It All (2010)
 Producing Parker (2008-2011)
 Real Men (2012)
 Ride (2016-Apr 14, 2017)
 The Riot At Christie Pitz! (2016)
 Rocket Monkeys (2012-2016)
 The Secret Liberators (2017)
 Shadow Lake (2016)
 Shaye: This Is It (2016)
 Situation Critical (2016)
 Skooled (2016)
 Star Falls (2018)
 Stories of Mothers & Daughters (2017)
 Streets of the World! (2012)
 Striking Back! (2013)
 Swap TV (2014)
 Tooned! (2008-2009)
 The Toronto Show (2016-present)
 Vandits (2022)
 Wandering Wenda! (2017)
 War of the Wheels (2015)
 Zerby Derby (2018)

References

External links
 Official website

Canadian animation studios
Film production companies of Canada
Television production companies of Canada
Entertainment companies established in 2001